Cascales Canton is a canton of Ecuador, located in the Sucumbíos Province.  Its capital is the town of Cascales.  Its population at the 2001 census was 7,409.

References

Cantons of Sucumbíos Province